Fred Daigle (born 9 September 1930) is a Canadian boxer. He competed in the men's bantamweight event at the 1948 Summer Olympics.

1948 Olympic results
Below is the record of Fred Daigle, a Canadian bantamweight boxer who competed at the 1948 London Olympic Games:

 Round of 32: lost to Jimmy Carruthers (Australia) by disqualification in the second round.

References

External links
 
Website with memorabilia

1930 births
Living people
Canadian male boxers
Olympic boxers of Canada
Boxers at the 1948 Summer Olympics
Boxers from Montreal
Bantamweight boxers